The William and Mary Quarterly is a quarterly history journal published by the Omohundro Institute of Early American History and Culture. The journal originated in 1892, making it one of the oldest scholarly journals in the United States. Currently in its third series, the Quarterly is the leading journal for the study of early American history and culture. It ranges chronologically from Old World–New World contacts to about 1820. Geographically, it focuses on North America—from New France and the Spanish American borderlands to British America and the Caribbean—and extends to Europe and West Africa. Though grounded in history, it welcomes works from all disciplines bearing on the early American period—for example, literature, law, political science, anthropology, archaeology, material culture, cultural studies.

The journal is named for the College of William and Mary where it was founded in 1892. It has been published in three successive series, with volume numbers repeating with each new series. The journal's first series of 27 volumes ran from 1892 to 1919. The second series began in 1921 and ended in 1943, while the third series began in 1944 and runs through the present day.

The journal is available online through the JSTOR service.

References

External links
 
 William and Mary Quarterly at JSTOR

History of the Americas journals
College of William & Mary student life
Publications established in 1892
English-language journals
Quarterly journals
1892 establishments in Virginia
Magazines published in Virginia